A source text is a text (sometimes oral) from which information or ideas are derived. In translation, a source text is the original text that is to be translated into another language.

Description
In historiography, distinctions are commonly made between three kinds of source texts:

Primary

Primary sources are firsthand written evidence of history made at the time of the event by someone who was present. They have been described as those sources closest to the origin of the information or idea under study. These types of sources have been said to provide researchers with "direct, unmediated information about the object of study." Primary sources are sources which, usually, are recorded by someone who participated in, witnessed, or lived through the event. These are also usually authoritative and fundamental documents concerning the subject under consideration. This includes published original accounts, published original works, or published original research. They may contain original research or new information not previously published elsewhere. They have been distinguished from secondary sources, which often cite, comment on, or build upon primary sources. They serve as an original source of information or new ideas about the topic. Primary and secondary, however, are relative terms, and any given source may be classified as primary or secondary, depending on how it is used. Physical objects can be primary sources.

Secondary and tertiary

Secondary sources are written accounts of history based upon the evidence from primary sources. These are sources which, usually, are accounts, works, or research that analyze, assimilate, evaluate, interpret, and/or synthesize primary sources. These are not as authoritative and are supplemental documents concerning the subject under consideration. These documents or people summarize other material, usually primary source material. They are academics, journalists, and other researchers, and the papers and books they produce. This includes published accounts, published works, or published research. For example, a history book drawing upon diary and newspaper records.

Tertiary sources are compilations based upon primary and secondary sources. These are sources which, on average, do not fall into the above two levels. They consist of generalized research of a specific subject under consideration. Tertiary sources are analyzed, assimilated, evaluated, interpreted, and/or synthesized from secondary sources, also. These are not authoritative and are just supplemental documents concerning the subject under consideration. These are often meant to present known information in a convenient form with no claim to originality. Common examples are encyclopedias and textbooks.

The distinction between  primary source and secondary source is standard in historiography, while the distinction between these sources and tertiary sources is more peripheral, and is more relevant to the scholarly research work than to the published content itself.

Below are types of sources that most generally, but not absolutely, fall into a certain level. The letters after an item describes generally the type it is (though this can vary pending the exact source). P is for Primary sources, S is for Secondary sources, and T is for Tertiary sources. (ed., those with ?s are indeterminate.)

 Published Documents
 Maps
 Literature
 Autobiographies 
 Biographies 
 Poems
 Books
 Magazines 
 Newspaper articles 
 Pamphlets 
 Posters 
 Advertisements 
 Research 
 Peer Journals 
 Non-government documents
 Organization papers 
 Government documents 
 Public records 
 Voter lists 
 Police records 
 Court records 
 Court hearings 
 Court proceedings 
 Tax accounts
 Census data and records 
 Classified documents 
 Laws 
 Treaties 
 Court decisions 
 Unpublished Documents
 Personal papers 
 Letters 
 Diaries 
 Journals 
 Wills 
 Research
 Surveys
 Fieldwork
 Reports
 Speeches
 Interviews
 Membership records
 Meeting transcripts
 Financial accounts

Authoritative sources
A source that is official is called authoritative if it is known to be reliable and its authority or authenticity is widely recognized by experts in the field. Libraries specialize in collecting these types of resources so that students and faculty have the tools they need to research effectively.

In translation

In translation, a source text (ST) is a text written in a given source language which is to be or has been, translated into another language. According to Jeremy Munday's definition of translation, "the process of translation between two different written languages involves the changing of an original written text (the source text or ST) in the original verbal language (the source language or SL) into a written text (the target text or TT) in a different verbal language (the target language or TL)". The terms 'source text' and 'target text' are preferred over 'original' and 'translation' because they do not have the same positive vs. negative value judgment.

Translation scholars including Eugene Nida and Peter Newmark have represented the different approaches to translation as falling broadly into source-text-oriented or target-text-oriented categories.

See also
 Journalism sourcing
 Source (disambiguation)
 Text (disambiguation)
 Wikisource

References 

Translation
Translation studies
Sources